Home and Away is an Australian soap opera first broadcast on the Seven Network on 17 January 1988. The following is a list of characters that first appeared in 1999, by order of first appearance. They were all introduced by the show's then execution producer John Holmes. The 12th season of Home and Away began airing on 11 January 1999 The first introduction of the year was Nick Smith, played by Matt Juarez in March. Nick's father Ken, played by Anthony Phelan debuted in April. Aleetza Wood began playing Peta Janossi in May. Cameron Welsh arrived as Mitch McColl in July. Bianca Zeboat and lifeguard Shauna Bradley, played by Kylie Watson, were introduced in August. Science teacher Harry Reynolds, played by Justin Melvey arrived in September. Anna Hruby and Stephen James King joined the cast as acting principal Judith Ackroyd and her son, Edward Dunglass, respectively in October.

Nick Smith
	
Nick Smith  first appeared during the episode airing on 18 March 1999, played by Matt Guarez in a guest role and then returned as a regular character in 2000 played by Chris Egan and departed on 9 September 2003. Aaron Puckeridge also played Nick in flashbacks in 2003. For his portrayal of Nick, Egan was nominated for "Best New Male Talent" at the Logie Awards in 2001.

Ken Smith

Peta Janossi

Peta Janossi, portrayed by Aleetza Wood debuted on the series on 27 May 1999 and departed on 14 July 2000. Wood won the role while studying at University. While filming with co-star Zac Drayson, Wood was approached by some fans. "I was filming on location when I first started on Home and Away and there were some English tourists asking Zac for autographs. They then turned to me and they all asked me for my autograph; I had no idea what to do or write. I actually think I was more nervous than they were". Series Producer Russell Webb chose Wood for the role of Peta due to her "fresh-faced" look. For her portrayal of Peta, Wood was nominated for a "Most Popular New Female Talent" award in 2000.

Mitch McColl

Mitch McColl, played by Cameron Welsh debuted on-screen during the episode airing on 15 July 1999.  Welsh auditioned for the role with the predicate that it would only be a guest role. In 2000, Welsh was diagnosed with a herniated disc in his back and was ordered to take bed rest. Producers granted Welsh a six-week break but decided to hire Mitchell McMahon to play Mitch in his absence. Welsh said it felt "weird" seeing another actor playing Mitch but as he was involved in a "big storyline" at the time, producers were left with no other option. After his return, Welsh's scenes as Mitch started airing once again from 3 April 2000. In 2005, Welsh filmed a cameo for the serial's 4000th episode, which saw Mitch return for Alf Stewart's (Ray Meagher) birthday. Welsh later became Home and Away's producer. He said that playing Mitch helped give him a better understanding when it came to producing the serial. For his portrayal of Mitch, Welsh was nominated for the "Best New Male Talent" Logie Award in 2000. James Joyce of The Newcastle Herald said that Mitch made a big impact in his first episode on-screen. He later opined that Mitch and Hayley's first kiss was "long-awaited" and had that the pair had "lustful eyes" for one another. When they face "frustration" after the kiss, he added that fans "crave this sort of teasing". A columnist for the Daily Record chose Mitch's exit as one of their TV highlights of the week.

Bianca Zeboat

Bianca Zeboat, played by Lara Cox, made her first appearance on 11 August 1999. Cox won the extended guest role of Bianca shortly after she finished filming on fellow serial drama Heartbreak High, and was surprised that she would be appearing in two shows at the same time. Cox compared Bianca to her Heartbreak High character Anita Scheppers, saying "I have more in common with Anita than Bianca. While Anita is basically good, Bianca is a nasty, nasty piece of work! I don't like her at all." Cox also called Bianca a "manipulator", and said she would never behave in the same way or be as sexually overt as her. But she thought Bianca was quite assertive and strong, which was something Anita could benefit from. An Inside Soap writer commented, "The moment Bianca steps into the Summer Bay Diner, it's clear she's trouble."

Bianca is a model and actress, who is keen to get the lead role in the film adaptation of Alan Fisher's (Simon Bossell) 1989 novel On the Crest of a Wave. She arrives in Summer Bay ahead of filming and befriends Jesse McGregor (Ben Unwin), in the hope of gaining some inside information about the role. Jesse is "besotted" by Bianca, and Unwin said that his character cannot see her bad side, as he is looking for a partner and mother figure for his daughter. The film's director Roger Landowne (Tony Bonner) fires Bianca and recasts her role. She immediately breaks up with Jesse and leaves the Bay.

Shauna Bradley

Shauna Bradley, played by Kylie Watson made her first screen appearance during the episode broadcast on 16 August 1999 and departed in July 2002. In February 1999, shortly after she had moved back to Canberra, Watson landed an audition for Home And Away. She initially decided not to attend the audition because she did not think she would get the part. However, her agent told her to go and she won the role of Shauna. Watson revealed "Suddenly I had this opportunity thrown at me, that I'd always dreamed of, and I felt great. I came back to Sydney to start filming in June." As Home and Away was her first acting job, Watson's agent booked her into some acting classes. She commented "I think I was really bad, to be honest, at the beginning. But like anything if you really put your mind to it and love what you do, you invest the time to grow and educate yourself and I did do that." Watson made her first appearance as Shauna in August that same year. For her portrayal of Shauna, Watson earned a nomination for Most Popular New Female Talent at the 2000 Logie Awards. Karman Kregloe of AfterEllen called Shauna "sassy", while The People's Sharon Marshall branded her "feisty". Andrew Mercado, author of Super Aussie Soaps, said Shauna was a "sexy lifesaver". A writer for Inside Soap commented that Shauna's relationship with Harry had "more ups and downs than a kangaroo on a trampoline." While their colleague proclaimed that she played with fire when she got involved with Gavin.  In 2012, Channel 5 shortlisted the episode in which Shauna confronts Margaret and learns she is adopted for their "From Day One" feature, which saw viewers vote for their favourite episodes.

Harry Reynolds

Harry Reynolds, played by Justin Melvey, made his first appearance on 13 September 1999 and departed on 26 January 2001. Prior to joining the serial, Melvey's career involved modelling, studying and improving his acting skills. When Melvey decided to "lay some grassroots", the opportunity to play Harry Reynolds in Home and Away came up. Of this Melvey said "I flew back to Sydney and auditioned for the role on a Thursday, found out I had it the following Monday, and then had to go back to LA to do a hair commercial on Tuesday. After that, I basically had to pack up my life, say goodbye to my friends and move back to Australia." In 2000, Melvey won the "Most Popular New Male Talent" Logie Award for his portrayal of Harry.

Judith Ackroyd

Judith Ackroyd portrayed by actress Anna Hruby, made her first appearance on 21 October 1999 and departed on 21 November 2000. Prior to starring in Home and Away, Hruby had previously played Paddy Lawson on Prisoner Cell Block H.

Judith takes over as principal of Summer Bay High after Donald Fisher (Norman Coburn) takes a sabbatical. She overhears a conversation between  Mitch McColl and Hayley Smith discussing the fact that Donald thought Judith had slept her way into the job due to achieving the position at younger age. Judith is annoyed until Donald sets her straight.

Judith's son, Edward Dunglass arrives. He is the result of an affair she had had some years previous with an older married lecturer, Edward Dunglass Snr. (Peter Sumner). Edward Snr had died of Huntington's disease, meaning there is a fair chance Edward has inherited it. Judith is tolerant of Edward's eccentric, rebellious streak. Judith and Donald begin to see eye-to-eye after she helps him re-write his novel A Letter to Byron. She also clashes with Gypsy Nash (Kimberley Cooper) who runs for school captain when she blocks her appointment. Gypsy retaliates by spreading rumours that Judith is having an affair with Donald.

Judith is somewhat shocked when Edward announces that he has "married" his girlfriend Peta Janossi (Aleetza Wood) in a private ceremony in her garden and they plan to move in together. Neither Judith nor Joel Nash (David Woodley), Peta's foster father are happy about the idea but as a compromise Judith agrees to let Peta move in with them. After Donald's wife, Marilyn (Emily Symons) leaves him following the death of their son, Judith becomes closer to Donald. Edwards is keen for Judith to pursue a relationship with him but she ultimately ends up with the recently separated Joel. When Edward's diagnosis is confirmed, Judith gives him a video message that his father has recorded. Afterwards, Edward and Peta leave to go travelling after Judith arranges for the pair to go and stay with her cousin in Rome as the first stage of their trip.

Judith's relationship with Joel begins to deteriorate when they move into together and discuss the idea of children. When Joel is injured in the mudslide, his wife Natalie (Antoinette Byron) returns. Joel tells Judith he will move back in with her but on the day he is discharged from hospital Judith drives him to Natalie, who he reconciles with and relocates to Queensland with. She is upset but throws herself into applying for a job in Switzerland. Judith worries she has failed the interview but is accepted. Before leaving, she recommends Donald return to his position and hires Sally Fletcher (Kate Ritchie).

Edward Dunglass

Edward Dunglass played by Stephen James King, made his first appearance on 28 October 1999 and departed on 14 July 2000. King joined the serial while in High School and juggled his studies with acting. Edward was King's first television role after mainly working in theatres. King spoke to the serial's official website about his experiences on the show and said he was "amazed" by the older actors. "They have taught me so much, it has felt like the new kid at school, when you walk in and don't know anyone and then you find your feet and settle in – it hasn't taken long. Everyone is so welcoming and has been fantastic".  He also spoke about other characters' attitudes towards Edward. "Edward is judged by every one else, they think he is some evil character and going to cause trouble. I think it is because he looks so different from everyone else, he is not the stereotypical blonde hair blue eyed surfer who hangs out in Summer Bay – he looks quite different. So everyone has the same kind of opinion of him Edward is a refreshing change to Summer Bay". The website commented that Edward is "not a common sight amongst the stereotypical blonde haired beauties, that reside in Summer Bay".

Edward is first seen on the beach. Will Smith (Zac Drayson) makes fun of his unusual goth appearance but Edward responds in an equally sarcastic manner. He later saves Duncan Stewart (Brendan McKensy) from a group of bullies and as such earns an invite to join the rest of the local teens at the caravan park for their go kart trials. Edward stuns everyone by getting the best lap but they are interrupted by their new school principal, Judith Ackroyd (Anna Hruby) who Edward reveals to be his mother.

Donald Fisher (Norman Coburn) recognises Edward's name as he knew his father, Edward Snr (Peter Sumner) at University. Edward Snr died of Huntington's disease and Edward is fully aware that he may well have inherited it from him. Edward quickly befriends Peta Janossi (Aleetza Wood) and Mitch McColl (Cameron Welsh). He helps Peta stage a memorial service for her late grandmother who died overseas by lighting candles near the grave of a woman of a similar age. Colleen Smart (Lyn Collingwood) witnesses this and becomes paranoid that Edward is dabbling in the occult.

Edward's friendship with Duncan makes waves with his parents Alf and Ailsa (Judy Nunn). His opinion that Donald's son Byron's death was better than living with an illness quickly draws ire and is left feeling angry himself with Donald reveals to Alf Edward's own illness. Edward's search for thrills due to his potentially short life begins scaring people. Peta is annoyed when Edward dives off Jump Rock and breaks up with him. They reconcile and begin taking self-defence lessons after being hassled by two boys on the beach. Visible symptoms of Huntingdon's begin to show including muscle spasms and temporary paralysis, and Edward is keen to experience everything. He tries to seduce Peta but is caught in the act by her foster father, Joel Nash (David Woodley). Edward and Peta then "marry" in a private ceremony and consummate the relationship. They decide to move in together, much to Joel's chagrin but Judith agrees to let Peta move in with her and Edward. The couple clash when they try to line Judith up with Donald and Joel respectively.

Shortly after turning 18, Edward takes the test for Huntingdon's which returns positive and he downplays until one day he breaks down in front of Peta and Mitch during a laughing fit. Judith gives him Edward Snr's video message he had recorded prior to his death, in the event of Edward inheriting the disease and although he is initially angry she hadn't given it to him before, he calms down. Edward then removes his gothic make-up and asks Judith for his trust fund in order for him to travel with Peta and she complies, arranging for them to stay with her sister in Rome. Edward becomes tired and irritable in the days leading up to their departure and worries Peta may not stay with him but she assures him she will and they leave after a fond farewell. Will visits them the following year and when returns he confirms Edward's condition is worsening.

Others

References

External links
Characters and cast at the Official AU Home and Away website
Characters and cast at the Official UK Home and Away website
Characters and cast at the Internet Movie Database

, 1999
, Home and Away